The following highways are numbered 854:

United States